Rinpoche, also spelled Rimboche and Rinboku, is an honorific term used in the Tibetan language. It literally means "precious one", and may refer to a person, place, or thing—like the words "gem" or "jewel" (Sanskrit: Ratna).

The word consists of rin (value), po (nominalizing suffix) and chen (big).

The word is used in the context of Tibetan Buddhism as a way of showing respect when addressing those recognized as reincarnated, older, respected, notable, learned and/or an accomplished Lamas or teachers of the Dharma. It is also used as an honorific for abbots of Buddhist monasteries.

See also
Rinpoches, a partial list of a few spiritual teachers of past and present commonly addressed as Rinpoche.
Tulku, someone who is recognized as the rebirth of a previous practitioner of Tibetan Buddhism.
Mount Kailash is often called in the Tibetan language Gang Rinpoche.

References

External links
Rinpoche entry in Rangjung Yeshe wiki.

 
Honorifics
Lamas
Tibetan Buddhist titles
Religious leadership roles